Artist's Shit is a 1961 artwork by the Italian artist Piero Manzoni.

Inspiration and interpretations
At the time the piece was created, Manzoni was producing works that explored the relationship between art production and human production, Artist's Breath, a series of balloons filled with his own breath, being an example.

In December 1961, Manzoni wrote in a letter to his friend Ben Vautier:

Another friend, Enrico Baj, has said that the cans were meant as "an act of defiant mockery of the art world, artists, and art criticism".

Artist's Shit has been interpreted in relation to Karl Marx's idea of commodity fetishism, and Marcel Duchamp's readymades.

In September 2021, YBA artist Gavin Turk made a piece called "Artist's Piss" where he canned his own urine and sold it for its weight in silver.

Value
A tin was sold for €124,000 at Sotheby's on May 23, 2007. In October 2008, tin 83 was offered for sale at Sotheby's with an estimate of £50,000–70,000. It sold for £97,250. On October 16, 2015, tin 54 was sold at Christies for £182,500. In August 2016, at an art auction in Milan, one of the tins sold for a new record of €275,000, including auction fees. The tins were originally to be valued according to their equivalent weight in gold – $37 each in 1961 – with the price fluctuating according to the market.

Contents of the cans
One of Manzoni's friends, Agostino Bonalumi, claimed that the tins are full not of faeces but plaster. The cans are steel, and thus cannot be x-rayed or scanned to determine the contents, and opening a can would cause it to lose its value; thus, the true contents of Artist's Shit are unknown. Bernard Bazile exhibited a partially opened can of Artist's Shit in 1989, titling it Opened can of Piero Manzoni. The can's contents were difficult to identify on sight, being variously described as "paper wrapping with unidentified contents", "an unidentifiable wrapped object" and "a can within a can". Bazile did not attempt to extract or open the inner object.

The piece received media coverage due to a lawsuit in the mid-1990s, when an art museum in Randers, Denmark was accused by art collector John Hunov of causing leakage of a can which had been on display at the museum in 1994. Allegedly, the museum had stored the can at irresponsibly high temperatures. The lawsuit ended with the museum paying a 250,000 Danish kroner settlement to the collector, approximately US$35,000.

See also
 Shock art
 Gavin Turk

References

Sources
Neue Zürcher Zeitung, Nr. 89.76

External links
 "Merda d'Artista, or, You Call That Shit Art?"
 Tate Collection catalogue entry

1961 works
Abstract art
Works about feces